Mohd Syukri bin Baharun (born 27 June 1999) is a Malaysian professional footballer who plays as a midfielder for Malaysia Super League club Perak.

References

External links

1999 births
Living people
Malaysian footballers
People from Sabah
Sabah F.C. (Malaysia) players
Melaka United F.C. players
Perak F.C. players
Association football midfielders